Pierre François Maletti, C.R.L.; ; ; (1564–1631) was a Roman Catholic prelate who served as Bishop of Nice (1622–1631).

Biography 
Pier Francesco Maletti was born in Vercelli in 1564, son of the noble doctor Giambattista, and ordained a priest in the Canons Regular of the Lateran.

In his order he became Abbot of the Abbey of St Andrew in Vercelli, Visitor General and then Superior general.

On 10 January 1622, he was appointed during the papacy of Pope Gregory XV as Bishop of Nice.

On 30 January 1622, he was consecrated bishop by Ludovico Ludovisi, Archbishop of Bologna, with Galeazzo Sanvitale, Archbishop Emeritus of Bari-Canosa, and Alfonso Gonzaga, Titular Archbishop of Rhodus, serving as co-consecrators. 

On behalf of the Duke of Savoy, he dealt effectively with the cause of canonization of Blessed Amedeo IX and wrote «Istoria del Venerabile Amedeo III Duca di Savoia, Torino, presso Gianantonio Seghino, 1613» [''History of the Venerable Amadeus, III Duke of Savoy'].

He served as Bishop of Nice until his death on 4 December 1631. 

While bishop, he was the principal co-consecrator of Marco Antonio Quirino, Archbishop of Naxos (1622).

References 

1564 births
1631 deaths
People from Vercelli
17th-century Italian Roman Catholic bishops
Bishops appointed by Pope Gregory XV